Hacine "Billy" Cherifi (born 12 December 1967) is a French former professional boxer who competed from 1985 to 2005. He held the WBC middleweight title in 1998. He made two other attempts at world titles; the WBC super middleweight title in 1997 and the WBA middleweight title in 2000. At regional level, he twice held the French middleweight title, firstly from 1995 to 1996 and again from 2002 to 2003. He also held the EBU European middleweight title from 1996 to 1997.

Cherifi, known as "Billy", began his pro career in 1989 and challenged for the WBC super middleweight title in 1997 against Robin Reid, losing split decision. After the loss, he dropped down in weight and took on WBC middleweight  champion, Keith Holmes, winning a decision, although he was dropped in the ninth round. In 1999, he lost the belt in his first defense to Holmes in a rematch via seventh-round knockout. In 2000 he got a shot at WBA middleweight champion William Joppy. Cherifi was dominated and knocked down in Rounds 8 and 9, and lost by decision. In 2001 he took on Harry Simon for the interim WBO middleweight title and lost a decision in what would be his last shot at a major title. He retired in 2005 after suffering a TKO loss to Rudy Markussen.

External links 
 

1967 births
Living people
French sportspeople of Algerian descent
French male boxers
Middleweight boxers
Algerian male boxers